The carotid triangle (or superior carotid triangle) is a portion of the anterior triangle of the neck.

Coverings and boundaries
It is bounded:
 Posteriorly by the anterior border of the Sternocleidomastoid;
 Anteroinferiorly, by the superior belly of the Omohyoid muscle. 
 Superiorly by the posterior belly of the digastric muscle.

It is (covered) by the integument, superficial fascia, Platysma and deep fascia; ramifying in which are branches of the facial and cutaneous cervical nerves.

Its floor is formed by parts of the 

Thyrohyoid membrane,

Hyoglossus, and the

Constrictores pharyngis medius and inferior.

Arteries

The external and internal carotids lie side by side, the external being the more anterior of the two.

The following branches of the external carotid are also met with in this space:
 the superior thyroid artery, running forward and downward;
 the lingual artery, directly forward;
 the facial artery, forward and upward;
 the occipital artery, backward and upward;
 the ascending pharyngeal artery, directly upward on the medial side of the internal carotid.

Veins
The veins met with are:
 the internal jugular vein, which lies on the lateral side of the common and internal carotid arteries;
 and veins corresponding to the above-mentioned branches of the external carotid—viz.,
 the superior thyroid vein,
 the lingual veins,
 common facial vein draining into the internal jugular vein,
 ascending pharyngeal usually ending in the internal jugular vein,
 and sometimes the occipital vein

...all of which end in the internal jugular vein.

Nerves
Superficial to the carotid sheath lies the hypoglossal nerve and ansa cervicalis of the cervical plexus.

The hypoglossal nerve crosses both the internal and external carotids, curving around the origin of the occipital artery.

Within the sheath, between the artery and vein, and behind both, is the vagus nerve; behind the sheath, the sympathetic trunk.

On the lateral side of the vessels, the accessory nerve runs for a short distance before it pierces the Sternocleidomastoideus; and on the medial side of the external carotid, just below the hyoid bone, the internal branch of the superior laryngeal nerve may be seen; and, still more inferiorly, the external branch of the same nerve.

Other contents
The upper portion of the larynx and lower portion of the pharynx are also found in the front part of this space.

See also
 Anterior triangle of the neck
 Farabeuf's Triangle

Additional images

References

External links
 
 
 

Human head and neck
Triangles of the neck